Il-Widna is a large acoustic mirror located in Magħtab, Malta.' The colloquial name of the acoustic mirror refers to Ear in Maltese. The mirror was used during the Axis bombardment of Malta during the Second World war to detect incoming Luftwaffe (1941-1942) and Regia Aeronautica (1940-1941) bombers seeking to airstrike Malta. Il-Widna faces towards the island of Sicily, in Italy at a bearing of around 20 degrees. The mirror is also the only acoustic not built in the UK. Il-Widna was built between the autumn of 1934 and the summer of 1935. The required electrical equipment was installed in the first weeks of September 1935. The total cost of the development of the mirror on Malta was put at £4500.

References 

Acoustics
Buildings and structures in Malta
Magħtab